Hypatopa agnae is a moth in the family Blastobasidae. It is found in Costa Rica.

The length of the forewings is about 4.5 mm. The forewings are pale brown intermixed with brownish-orange scales and brown scales. The hindwings are translucent pale brown.

Etymology
The specific name is derived from Latin agna (meaning a ewe or a lamb).

References

Moths described in 2013
Hypatopa